Rockin' with Kay is a studio album by Kay Starr. It was released in 1958 by RCA Victor (catalog no. LPM-1720). It was her third album for RCA Victor.

Reception

Upon its release, Billboard magazine gave the album a rating of three stars and wrote: "The wonderful, husky expressiveness of the Starr gal comes through on this selection of tunes arranged for rocking delivery."

AllMusic also gave the album a rating of three stars. Reviewer William Ruhlmann wrote that the arrangements were "bluesy and rocking" and that Starr sang with "her usual throaty abandon."

Track listing
Side A
 "Dry Bones" (traditional) [2:30]
 "Rockin' Chair" (Hoagy Carmichael) [3:20]
 "I Gotta Get Away from You" (Hal Stanley) [1:57]
 "Till We Meet Again" (Raymond B. Egan, Richard A. Whiting) [2:27]
 "True Blue Lou" (Sam Coslow, Leo Robin, Richard A. Whiting) [2:37]
 "Lazy Bones" (Hoagy Carmigchael, Johnny Mercer) [3:20]

Side B
 "Lonesome Road" (traditional) [3:23]
 "The Glory of Love" (Billy Hill) [2:39]
 "I'm Confessin'" (Doc Daugherty, Al J. Neiburg, Ellis Reynolds) [3:22]
 "Lover Man" (Jimmy Davis, Roger "Ram" Ramirez, Jimmy Sherman) [3:18]
 "How Deep Is the Ocean" (Iriving Berlin) [2:47]
 "Do I Worry" (Stanley Cowan, Bobby Worth) [3:03]

References

1958 albums
Kay Starr albums
RCA Victor albums